Brithdir is the name of a number of locations in Wales:

Villages
Brithdir, Carmarthenshire
Brithdir, Ceredigion
Brithdir, Conwy 
Brithdir, Flintshire
Brithdir, Gwynedd, noted for St Mark's Church, Brithdir
Brithdir Mawr, Pembrokeshire 
Brithdir, Powys

Districts of towns
Brithdir, Caerphilly
Brithdir, Bridgend